Caatinga is a type of semi-arid tropical vegetation, and an ecoregion characterized by this vegetation in interior northeastern Brazil. The name "Caatinga" is a Tupi word meaning "white forest" or "white vegetation" (caa = forest, vegetation, tinga = white).

The Caatinga is a xeric shrubland and thorn forest, which consists primarily of small, thorny trees that shed their leaves seasonally. Cacti, thick-stemmed plants, thorny brush, and arid-adapted grasses make up the ground layer. Most vegetation experiences a brief burst of activity during the three-month long rainy season.

Caatinga falls entirely within earth's tropical zone and is one of 6 major ecoregions of Brazil. It covers 850,000 km², nearly 10% of Brazil's territory. It is home to 26 million people and over 2000 species of plants, fish, reptiles, amphibians, birds, and mammals.

The Caatinga is the only exclusively Brazilian biome, which means that a large part of its biological heritage cannot be found anywhere else on the planet.

Geography

The Caatinga covers the interior portion of northeastern Brazil bordering the Atlantic seaboard (save for a fringe of Atlantic Forest), extending across nine states: Maranhão, Piauí, Ceará, Rio Grande do Norte, Paraíba, Pernambuco, Alagoas, Sergipe, Bahia, and parts of Minas Gerais. Altogether, the Caatinga comprises 850,000 km², about 10% of the surface area of Brazil.  By comparison, it is over nine times the surface area of Portugal, whence came Brazil's early European settlers.

Located between 3°S 45°W and 17°S 35°W, the Caatinga experiences irregular winds from all directions. Rainfall is thus intermittent but intense, totalling  on average.

To the northwest, the Caatinga is bounded by the Maranhão Babaçu forests; to the west and southwest, the Atlantic dry forests and Cerrado savannas; to the east, the humid Atlantic coastal forests; and to the north and northeast, the Atlantic Ocean.

Climate
During the dry winter periods there is no foliage or undergrowth, as plants try to conserve water. Roots protrude through the surface of the stony soil, to  absorb water before it is evaporated. Leaves fall off the trees to reduce transpiration. With all the foliage and undergrowth dead during the drought periods and all the trees having no leaves the Caatinga has a yellow-grey, desert-like look.  During the peak periods of drought the Caatinga's soil can reach temperatures of up to 60 °C. 
The drought usually ends in December or January, when the rainy season starts. Immediately after the first rains, the grey, desert-like landscape starts to transform and becomes completely green within a few days. Small plants start growing in the now moist soil and trees grow back their leaves. Rivers that are mostly dry during the past 6 or 7 months start to fill up and streams begin to flow again.

Ecology
Caatinga harbors a unique biota, with thousands of endemic species. Caatinga contains over 1,000 vascular plant species in addition to 187 bees, 240 fish species, 167 reptiles and amphibians, 516 birds, and 148 mammal species, with endemism levels varying from 9 percent in birds to 57 percent in fishes.

Vegetation
The Caatinga does not correspond to a single type of vegetation, but rather a broad mosaic.  Nonetheless, all vegetative structure is adapted to the xeric climate.  Succulent and crassulaceous species dominate; non-succulents exhibit small, firm leaves and intense branching at the base, akin to shrubs.  Palm stands usually contain carnaúba or babaçu palms, but occasionally tucumã and macaúba.

The Caatinga has enough endemic species to constitute a floristic province.   
Most authors divide the Caatinga into two different subtypes: dry ("sertão") and humid ("agreste"), but categorizations vary to as many as eight different vegetative regimes.

Fauna

The Caatinga is home to nearly 50 endemic species of birds, including Lear's macaw (Anodorhynchus leari), Spix's macaw (Cyanopsitta spixii), moustached woodcreeper (Xiphocolaptes falcirostris), Caatinga parakeet,
Caatinga antwren, Sao Francisco black tyrant and Caatinga cacholote.

Endemic mammal species include:

eleven rodents - Caatinga vesper mouse, Wiedomys pyrrhorhinos, Trinomys yonenagae, Trinomys albispinus minor, Trinomys albispinus sertonius, Thylamys karimii, Dasyprocta sp. n., Oryzomys sp. n., Oxymycterus sp. n., Rhipidomys sp. n. ssp. 1, and Rhipidomys sp. n. ssp. 2
one primate - Callicebus barbarabrownae
two bats - Xeronycteris vieirai and Chiroderma sp. n

Possible anthropogenic origins 
Based on radiocarbon dating of potsherds, proponents of historical ecology such as William Denevan and William Balee have suggested that large sections of the Caatinga region may be of anthropogenic origin. Over 1000 years ago, native peoples may have unintentionally created the environment of the modern-day Caatinga through constant slash-and-burn agriculture, thereby stymying plant succession and preventing major rainforests from growing within the region.

Conversely, fossil evidence suggests that the Caatinga may historically have been part of a much larger dry belt.

Conservation
The Caatinga is poorly represented in the Brazilian Conservation Area network, with only 1% in Integral Protection Conservation Areas and 6% in Sustainable Use Conservation Areas. Protected areas include Chapada Diamantina National Park, Serra da Capivara National Park, and Serra das Confusões National Park.

Economic developed has fragmented the native biome.  Estimates on the amount of Caatinga transformed affected by economic development range 25-50%, making Caatinga the most degraded ecosystem in Brazil, following the Atlantic Forest, which has lost over 80% of its original cover.

Economic exploitation

The local population lives in extreme poverty, and many rely on extraction of natural resources for a livelihood.  There are few drinkable water sources, and harvesting is difficult because of the irregular rainfall.

Agriculture 
Native plants are used in local agriculture, much of it slash-and-burn. Pilocarpus jaborandi appears to exhibit medicinal properties.  The fruits of umbú and mangabá are used as food directly, and other species are used for forage.  Local palms produce commercial-grade lauric and oleic oils, which undergirds much of the economy of northeast Brazil.

Meliponiculture is also a well-developed and traditional activity in the region. One of the most productive species, Melipona subnitida, known locally as jandaíra, produces up to 6 liters of honey a year, resulting in economic profit for the population.

Irrigation along the São Francisco River promises to turn the region into a breadbasket.  The soil is very fertile, and existing irrigation infrastructure already supports the export of grapes, papayas and melons.  At the same time, irrigation threatens to salinize the soil.

Grazing 
Cattle (Guzerá and Red Sindhi cattle) and goat farming are popular and very productive in the region.  Overgrazing and timbering for fuelwood have decimated local vegetative populations; outside irrigated regions, the area has begun to desertify à la Sahara and Sahel.

See also

On Caatinga
Caatinga moist-forest enclaves
Northeastern Brazil
Sertão
List of plants of Caatinga vegetation of Brazil

The five other major ecoregions of Brazil 
 Amazon Basin
 Pantanal
 Cerrado
 Atlantic Forest
 Pampas

Notes

References

Further reading
 Llosa, Mario Vargas - The War of the End of the World

Historical biogeographic surveys
 Marcgrav (1638)
 Spix & Martius (1817-1820)

External links

IBAMA
Brazil Nature
Caatinga: Brazilian national heritage threatened
Associação Mãe-da-lua The Avifauna of northeastern Brazil

 
Deserts and xeric shrublands
Ecoregions of Brazil
Neotropical ecoregions
Regions of Brazil
Natural regions of South America
Biosphere reserves of Brazil